The 2017 Kennesaw State Owls football team represented Kennesaw State University in the 2017 NCAA Division I FCS football season. They were led by third-year head coach Brian Bohannon and played their home games at Fifth Third Bank Stadium in Kennesaw, Georgia as third-year members of the Big South Conference. They finished the season 12–2, 5–0 in Big South play to win the Big South conference championship. The Owls received the Big South's automatic bid to the FCS Playoffs, their first trip to the playoffs in school history. In the first round of the playoffs, the Owls defeated Samford in a rematch of their only regular season loss and marked the school's first ever playoff win. In the second round, the Owls upset No. 3 seed Jacksonville State to advance to the quarterfinals. In the quarterfinals, despite a furious second half comeback, they lost to Sam Houston State.

On January 9, 2018, head coach Brian Bohannon was named the American Football Coaches Association's Coach of the Year.

Previous season 
The Owls finished the 2016 season 8–3, 3–2 in Big South play to finish in a tie for third place.

Schedule

Source: Schedule

Game summaries

@ Samford

Tennessee Tech

@ Alabama State

North Greenville

Texas Southern

@ Liberty

Gardner–Webb

@ Presbyterian

@ Montana State

Charleston Southern

Monmouth

This victory clinched the Owls' first ever postseason bid.

FCS Playoffs

Samford–First Round

@ Jacksonville State–Second Round

@ Sam Houston State–Quarterfinals

Ranking movements

References

Kennesaw State
Kennesaw State Owls football seasons
Big South Conference football champion seasons
Kennesaw State
Kennesaw State Owls football